Antelope School is an historic building in Antelope, Oregon. Completed in 1924, the school is listed on the National Register of Historic Places.

The building no longer is used as a school, but as a community center and municipal office space.

See also
 National Register of Historic Places listings in Wasco County, Oregon

References

External links

 

1924 establishments in Oregon
Buildings and structures in Wasco County, Oregon
School buildings completed in 1924
School buildings on the National Register of Historic Places in Oregon